Dannielle Liesch (born 18 May 1978) is an Australian synchronized swimmer who competed in the 2000 Summer Olympics.

References

1978 births
Living people
Australian synchronised swimmers
Olympic synchronised swimmers of Australia
Synchronized swimmers at the 2000 Summer Olympics
Commonwealth Games medallists in synchronised swimming
Commonwealth Games silver medallists for Australia
Synchronised swimmers at the 2006 Commonwealth Games
Medallists at the 2006 Commonwealth Games